Kalmyk State University (Kalmyk: Хальмг улусин ик сурһуль, Hal’mg ulusin ik surhul’) is the oldest and largest university in Kalmykia. Since 2011 it is called Federal State Budget Educational Establishment of Higher Professional Education.  The university was established in 1970, and now it has more than 8,000 students, studying at 7 Departments and 1 institute:

 Department of Engineering and Technology;
 Department of Humanities;
 Department of Mathematics, Physics and Information Technology;
 Department of Pedagogical Education and Biology;
 Department of Agriculture;
 Department of Economics;
 Department of Management and Law;
 Institute of Kalmyk Philology and Oriental Studies.

External links 

Official site

Buildings and structures in Elista
Universities in Russia
Educational institutions established in 1970
1970 establishments in Russia